Tunikipadu is a village in NTR district of the Indian state of Andhra Pradesh. It is located in Gampalagudem mandal of Tiruvuru revenue division.

References

Villages in NTR district